The Cameroon Cup is the national football competition in Cameroon, on a knock-out-basis.

Cup Finals

Before independence 
 1941 : Caïman de Douala 6-0 Mikado ASTP
 1942 : Caïman de Douala 3-1 Léopards Douala
 1943 : Caïman de Douala
 1944-53 : Unknown
 1954 : Jeunesse Bamiléké 
 1956 : Oryx Douala 6-0 Léopards Douala
 1957 : Canon Yaoundé 1-0 Léopards Douala
 1958 : Tonnerre Yaoundé 3-1 Aigle Royal de la Menoua (Dschang)
 1959 : Caïman de Douala 2-1 Vent Sportif (Douala)

After independence

Total

References

External links 
 RSSSF competition history

Football competitions in Cameroon
Cameroon
1960 establishments in French Cameroon